Przybylski (feminine Przybylska, plural Przybylscy) is a Polish surname, it may refer to:
 Anna Przybylska (1978-2014), Polish actress and model
 Antoni Przybylski (1913-1984), Polish-Australian astronomer
 Przybylski's Star, named for him
 Bronisław Kazimierz Przybylski (1941-2011), Polish composer and educator
 Jerzy Przybylski (1923-1999), Polish actor
 Mariusz Przybylski (born 1982), Polish footballer
 Sława Przybylska (born 1932), Polish singer
 Stanisław Przybylski (1931-2010), Polish modern pentathlete
 Wojciech Przybylski (born 1939), Polish football manager

Polish-language surnames